Eibingen Abbey (full name: Benedictine Abbey of St. Hildegard) is a community of Benedictine nuns in Eibingen near Rüdesheim in Hesse, Germany. Founded by Hildegard of Bingen in 1165, it was dissolved in 1804, but restored, with new buildings, in 1904. The nuns produce wine and crafts. They sing regular services, which have been at times recorded. The church is also used as a concert venue. The abbey is a Rhine Gorge World Heritage Site.

History 
The original community was founded in 1165 by Hildegard of Bingen. This was the second community founded by her. It was disestablished in 1804. After the Reichsdeputationshauptschluss (German mediatization), the land once owned by the convent became part of the domains of the prince of Nassau-Weilburg who, in 1831, even bought both the monastery and its church.

The community was reestablished by Charles, 6th Prince of Löwenstein-Wertheim-Rosenberg in 1904 and resettled from St. Gabriel's Abbey in Prague. The nunnery belongs to the Beuronese Congregation within the Benedictine Confederation. A new building was erected in Neo-Romanesque style. In 1941, the nuns were expelled by the Nazis; they were not able to return until 1945. In 1988, the sisters founded Marienrode Priory at Hildesheim, which became independent of Eibingen in 1998.

The nuns work in the vineyard and in the craft workshops, besides undertaking the traditional duties of hospitality. A visitor watched the nuns using GPS systems, computers and modern kitchen tools. They can be heard (but not seen) singing their regular services. The nuns have recorded their Vespers. A first recording was made in 1973 and contained only two works by Hildegard of Bingen, a Kyrie and O virga ac diadema. A second recording appeared in 1979, to remember the 800th anniversary of Hildegard's death, including the same pieces and antiphones, a hymn, a responsory and parts of Ordo  virtutum. In 1989, a third recording appeared, conducted by P. Johannes Berchmans Göschl, a scholar of Gregorian chant. A reviewer of Gramophone noted about a 1998 recording: "These nuns are living the same life as that of Hildegard's community, singing daily the same Benedictine Office, breathing the same air and trying to capture the spirit of their great twelfth-century predecessor."

Abbesses 
 Hildegard of Bingen (1098–1179), first abbess and founder of the community

From 1603 the abbesses held the title of "Abbess of Rupertsberg and Eibingen".
 Kunigunde Frey von Dehrn, abbess around 1600
 Anna Lerch von Dirmstein, abbess until 1666
 Kunigunde Schütz von Holtzhausen, abbess from 1666 to 1669
 Scholastica von Manteuffel, abbess from 1670
 Maria Antonetta Mühl zu Ulmen, abbess from 1711

 Philippine zu Guttenberg, last abbess from 1790 to 1804.

Since the re-establishment of the community in 1904:

 Regintrudis Sauter, abbess from 1908 to 1955
 Fortunata Fischer, abbess from 1955 to 1978
 Edeltraut Forster, abbess from 1978 to 1998
 Gisela Happ, prioress-administrator from 1998 to 2000
 Clementia Killewald, abbess from 2000 to 2016
 Dorothea Flandera, abbess from 2016

Heritage 
The abbey is a Rhine Gorge World Heritage Site. The church has been a venue for concerts of the Rheingau Musik Festival, such as a "BachTrompetenGala" with organist Edgar Krapp and a concert with the New York Polyphony in 2014. The sculptor Karlheinz Oswald made in 1998 a life-size bronze statue called Hildegard of Bingen, with one copy in the Bingen museum, another in the garden in front of the abbey church.

References

External links

 
 Hildegardisvesper Vespers from Eibingen Abbey, YouTube, 20 September 2011
 The Hildegard of Bingen Trail in Germany spiritualtravels.info
 Sites › Rüdesheim › Abbey St. Hildegard landderhildegard.de
 Eibingen, Germany: Benedictine Abbey of Eibingen (Saint Hildegard of Bingen) thecatholictravelguide.com
 Gregor Kollmorgen: St. Hildegard Abbey newliturgicalmovement.org 11 November 2010

Monasteries in Hesse
1160s establishments in the Holy Roman Empire
1165 establishments in Europe
Religious organizations established in the 1160s
Christian monasteries established in the 12th century
Benedictine nunneries in Germany
World Heritage Sites in Germany
Buildings and structures in Rheingau-Taunus-Kreis
Hildegard of Bingen